HMS Royal Scotsman, originally the MV Royal Scotsman, was an LSI of the British Royal Navy that served during World War II. A former passenger ferry, she saw action in the Mediterranean during the invasions of North Africa (Operation Torch), Sicily and Italy.

The ship was later purchased in 1967 by the Church of Scientology, re-registered to Sierra Leone and renamed to the MV Royal Scotman (due to a transcription error)  and then MV Apollo. It served as the headquarters of the Church of Scientology, the founding flagship of the Sea Org, and the personal residence of L. Ron Hubbard until 1975.

Construction
The ship was built by Harland and Wolff, at Belfast, for the Burns and Laird Lines as Yard No. 964. Launched on 11 March 1936, the ship was completed on 29 May 1936, and entered service as MV Royal Scotsman as a passenger and cargo ferry in the Irish Sea, operating between Belfast and Glasgow.

Operational history
At 09:30 on 5 May 1940 Royal Scotsman left Gourock to transport Force HQ and the 3rd Independent Company to Bodø in Norway as part of "Scissorsforce", which was tasked with preventing the Germans from occupying Bodø, Mo and Mosjøen. They arrived off Bodø on 8th May but rough sea and poor visibility made a landing impossible, and the ship lay off until the weather improved, finally berthing at 22:00 on 9th May. Owing to the danger of air attack, disembarkation and unloading were carried out as quickly as possible and were completed by 02:00 on 10 May, when the Royal Scotsman departed.

Royal Scotsman was then requisitioned by the Admiralty in October 1940, for use as a store ship, commissioned as HMS Royal Scotsman, and modified for use as a Landing Ship, Infantry. Work was completed by January 1941, and she prepared for operational service. Most of the ship's company were the original merchant crew who had joined the Navy under T124X engagements (which meant that they could not be transferred to a combat ship), while the captain and some specialist officers were from the Royal Navy or Reservists.

Initially deployed in home waters, in August 1941, she embarked troops at the Clyde for "Operation Grey", a planned occupation of the Azores. After sailing to Scapa Flow to join military convoy WS-8C, the operation was cancelled, and Royal Scotsman returned to the Clyde. On 17 September 1941, she joined military convoy WS-11X in the Clyde, to transport military personnel to Gibraltar, as reinforcements for Malta ("Operation Halberd"), returning to the UK, in October, to train with Combined Operations personnel.

From January 1942, she took part in extensive exercises for amphibious operations, and on 26 October, sailed to Gibraltar, as part of military convoy KMF-1 for the invasion of North Africa, in "Operation Torch".

In May 1943, she took part in landings on the Italian island of Pantelleria ("Operation Corkscrew"), then on 10 July, landed troops on the beach codenamed "Bark South" during the Allied invasion of Sicily. In September, she sailed to Tripoli, to embark troops, and joined military convoy TSF-1 to land troops at Salerno, on 9 September. In November 1943, she returned to the UK.
 
There is no record of her being deployed in any further operations, though whether the ship was damaged or only used for training purposes is unknown. In February 1945, she was decommissioned and returned to her original owners in March.

Scientology
She remained in service with Burns & Laird, until 1967, when she was purchased by the Church of Scientology and renamed Apollo, to serve as flagship of the Sea Org, as well as the residence of Scientology founder L. Ron Hubbard and his family. She cruised mostly in the Mediterranean Sea and on the Atlantic coasts of Europe and Africa. Apollo served as the headquarters of the Church of Scientology until the church established its headquarters in Clearwater, Florida, in 1975.

Fate
Apollo was scrapped in 1984.

References

1936 ships
Troop ships of the Royal Navy
World War II naval ships of the United Kingdom
Ships built in Belfast
Ships built by Harland and Wolff
Scientology